1714 Sy, provisional designation , is a stony asteroid from the central regions of the asteroid belt, approximately 13 kilometers in diameter. It was discovered on 25 July 1951, by French astronomer Louis Boyer at Algiers Observatory in Algeria, North Africa, and named after French astronomer and orbit computer Frédéric Sy.

Orbit 

Sy orbits the Sun in the central main-belt at a distance of 2.2–3.0 AU once every 4 years and 1 month (1,503 days). Its orbit has an eccentricity of 0.15 and an inclination of 8° with respect to the ecliptic.

Physical characteristics 

PanSTARRS large-scale survey characterized Sy as a L-type asteroid, a rare subtype which falls into the broader complex of stony S-type asteroids.

Diameter and albedo 

According to the survey carried out by NASA's Wide-field Infrared Survey Explorer with its subsequent NEOWISE mission, Sy measures 13.998 kilometers in diameter, and its surface has an albedo of 0.157, while the Collaborative Asteroid Lightcurve Link assumes a standard albedo for stony asteroids of 0.20 and calculates a diameter of 12.39 kilometers with on an absolute magnitude of 11.9.

Photometry 

In March 2012, photometric observations at the Oakley Southern Sky Observatory, Australia, included this asteroid as a target. Due to rain and cloud coverage, no lightcurve could be constructed, and therefore no rotation period could be derived. However the 86 photometric data points allowed to find a maximum brightness variation of 0.95 magnitude. A high brightness amplitude of 0.95 is a strong indicator, that the body has a non-spheroidal shape. As of 2017, Sys rotation period still remains unknown.

Naming 

This minor planet was named after Frédéric Sy, who worked as a human orbit computer and as an assistant astronomer at Algiers and Paris Observatory, respectively. At Algiers Observatory, he observed asteroids and comets and was the first to discoverer a numbered minor planet, 858 El Djezaïr, in 1916. The official  was published by the Minor Planet Center on 1 August 1978.

References

External links 
 Asteroid Lightcurve Database (LCDB), query form (info )
 Dictionary of Minor Planet Names, Google books
 Asteroids and comets rotation curves, CdR – Observatoire de Genève, Raoul Behrend
 Discovery Circumstances: Numbered Minor Planets (1)-(5000) – Minor Planet Center
 
 

001714
Discoveries by Louis Boyer (astronomer)
Named minor planets
19510725